Henry Howard (September 1, 1955 – October 13, 2022) was a member of the Georgia House of Representatives from the 124th District, serving since 2019 as a member of the Democratic Party. Howard served as a member of the Appropriations, Education, Health & Services, Juvenile Justice, and Motor Vehicles committees.

Election 
In 2006, Henry "Wayne" Howard's father, Henry Howard, died in the midst of his term representing Georgia House District 121. The Henry senior's wife (Wayne Howard's step-mother), Earnestine Howard, ran unopposed and won the seat. The following term, Wayne ran against Earnestine for the seat.

References

1955 births
2022 deaths
21st-century American politicians
Democratic Party members of the Georgia House of Representatives
People from Augusta, Georgia